Isaac Mitchell (June 5, 1835 – February 2, 1893) was an American farmer and politician from New York.

Life 
Mitchell was born on June 5, 1835 in Stone Mills, New York, the son of Hiram Mitchell and Anna Wood.

Mitchell attended LaFargeville Academy, working on a farm in the summer while attending school in the winter. He also taught at school for several years while working on a farm. He became a successful farmer and land owner, and was involved in the cattle trade. He was involved in a bonding fight while town supervisor of Orleans, ultimately saving the town at least 50,000 dollars.

Mitchell was town assessor from 1876 to 1878, town supervisor from 1879 to 1884, and chairman of the supervisor board in 1883 and 1884. In 1889, he was elected to the New York State Assembly as a Republican, representing the Jefferson County 2nd District. He served in the Assembly in 1890 and 1891.

Mitchell was a director and president of the Jefferson County Agricultural Society and a member of the Freemasons. In 1863, he married Kate L. Bort of Orleans. Their children were Sadie L., Lottie, Fred B., and Lucien C.

Mitchell died at home of pneumonia on February 2, 1893. He was buried in Stone Mills Cemetery.

References

External links 

 The Political Graveyard
 Isaac Mitchell at Find a Grave

1835 births
1893 deaths
People from Jefferson County, New York
Farmers from New York (state)
Town supervisors in New York (state)
19th-century American politicians
Republican Party members of the New York State Assembly
American Freemasons
Deaths from pneumonia in New York (state)
Burials in New York (state)